Albatrellus ovinus (commonly known as Sheep Polypore) is a terrestrial polypore fungus found in western North America, and Northern Europe. It is very closely related to the rarer A. subrubescens, from which it may be distinguished microscopically by the amyloid spore wall. It is edible and sold commercially in Finland.

Description 
The cap is 4–20 cm wide, convex then flat or depressed, and white then tan or pinkish. The surface is dry and smooth but cracks with age. The whitish stalk is 3–10 cm tall and 1–4 cm wide, perhaps branching, with an equal or larger base.

The species may be edible if cooked, but is not recommended by some guides.

Similar species
A fuller discussion of the small color differences from the inedible Albatrellus subrubescens can be found at that extensive article. Microscopically, the spores of A. subrubescens are amyloid, while the ones of A. ovinus are not.

Also similar are Albatrellus flettii, Jahnoporus hirtus, Scutiger pes-caprae, and Scutiger ellisii.

References

External links

Russulales
Fungi of Europe